The Tatong railway line was a railway line in North Eastern Victoria, Australia, branching off of the North East railway line at Benalla railway station. It was opened on June 30, 1914 and was fully closed on April 27, 1988.

History 
The line was opened on June 30, 1914 primarily to bring farm produce and logs from the Tatong sawmill to Melbourne. By 1920 a horse drawn tramway was constructed in Tatong to transport wood from the two sawmills located in Tatong to the station however, in January of 1938 the horse tramway was removed and by March of 1943 the turntable and siding were both abolished as well. The line beyond the Vacuum Oil siding was closed in 1947 however the line remained open for freight to the Vacuum Oil siding until 1988 when the entire line was closed to all traffic.

Line Guide 
Branched from the North East railway line at Benalla Station
 Vacuum Oil Benalla siding
 Karn
 Lima
 Mallum
 Tatong

References 

Closed regional railway lines in Victoria (Australia)
Railway lines opened in 1914
Railway lines closed in 1988